Dasypogon bromeliifolius, commonly known as pineapple bush, is a   species of shrub in the family Dasypogonaceae native to Western Australia.

Taxonomy
D. bromeliifolius was first described by Robert Brown in 1810. The type specimen, BM000939359, was collected by Robert Brown in 1801/1802 at King George's Sound and is held at the British Museum.

References

Dasypogonaceae
Endemic flora of Western Australia
Taxa named by Robert Brown (botanist, born 1773)